Seasons of a Life, is a 2010 Malawian Legal drama film directed by Shemu Joyah and produced by FirstDawn Arts. The film stars Bennie Msuku in lead role along with Neria Chikhosi, Flora Suya and Tapiwa Gwaza made supportive roles.

This court legal drama focused about a domestic worker sexually molested by her employer who struggles to empower herself and improve her life. The film had its premier at Göteborg International Film Festival in Sweden on 31 January 2010. The film has also been nominated for awards in the Kenya, Cairo, and Zanzibar Film festivals. It was nominated in 8 categories at the 6th Africa Movie Academy Awards, including nominations for Best Screenplay and Best Original Soundtrack. Actress, Tapiwa Gwaza won a Nollywood award for best Performance by a supporting actress.

Cast
 Bennie Msuku as Kondani
 Neria Chikhosi as Thoko
 Flora Suya as Sungisa
 Tapiwa Gwaza as Tabitha

References

External links
 
 Seasons of a Life in YouTube

2010 films
Malawian drama films
2010 short films
2010s English-language films